Alison Meeke (born 7 June 1991), also referred to as Ali Meeke, is an Ireland women's field hockey international. She was a member of the Ireland team that played in the 2018 Women's Hockey World Cup final. Meeke has also won Irish Senior Cup and Women's Irish Hockey League titles with Loreto.

Early years, family and education
Between 2003 and 2009 Meeke attended The High School, Dublin. Between 
2010 and 2013 she attended Sallynoggin College of Further Education where she studied Fitness and Personal Training. Since 2017 she has attended St Mary's University, Twickenham where she is studying for a Master's degree in Strength and Conditioning. During her youth, Meeke also played Gaelic football with Ballyboden Wanderers. Together with Nicola Daly, she was a member of the Wanderers team that won 2008 Dublin Ladies Junior E Football Championship.

Domestic teams

Early years
Between 2003 and 2009, Meeke played field hockey for The High School, Dublin. Her team mates and fellow students included Nicola Daly. Meeke and Daly were members the High School team that finished as runners-up in the 2005 Leinster Schoolgirls' Premier League. In the final they lost 2–0 to an Our Lady's, Terenure team captained by Emer Lucey. In her youth Meeke also played for Corinthian Hockey Club. Meeke played for Dublin City University at intervarsity level, featuring in the 2009 Chilean Cup tournament. Her DCU team mates included Hannah Matthews.

Loreto
In 2008–09 Meeke was a member of the Loreto team that won the inaugural Women's Irish Hockey League title. She was also a member of the Loreto team won the 2009–10 Irish Senior Cup.  Meeke has also represented Loreto in European competitions. In June 2011 she was a member of the Loreto team that won the EuroHockey Club Champion's Challenge II. In June 2014 she was also a member of the Loreto team that finished third at the European Club Championship Trophy tournament hosted by Leicester Hockey Club. In May 2018 Meeke was named Player of the Tournament as Loreto won the EY Champions Trophy. Meeke's team mates at Loreto have included Nikki Symmons, Lizzie Colvin, Hannah Matthews and Nicola Daly.

PSI All Stars
In December 2018 Meeke played for the Pro Series Indoor International All-Stars in a series of exhibition indoor hockey games against South Africa.

Ireland international
Meeke made her senior debut for Ireland in April 2014 against India. In March 2015 Meeke was a member of the Ireland team that won a 2014–15 Women's FIH Hockey World League Round 2 tournament hosted in Dublin, defeating Canada in the final after a penalty shoot-out. She was also a member of the Ireland team that won the 2015 Women's EuroHockey Championship II, defeating the Czech Republic 5–0 in the final. In 2017 Meeke made her 100th senior Ireland appearance during a series of games against Spain.

Meeke represented Ireland at the 2018 Women's Hockey World Cup and was a prominent member of the team that won the silver medal. She featured in all of Ireland's games throughout the tournament, including the pool games against the United States, India  and England, the quarter-final against India, the semi-final against Spain  and the final against the Netherlands. In the quarter-final against India, Meeke scored in the penalty shoot–out to help send Ireland through to the semi-final.

Occupation
Meeke works as a field hockey coach and fitness instructor. Since 2011 she has coached at The High School, Dublin and since 2012 she has worked as a fitness instructor at University College Dublin. Since 2017 she has served as an ambassador for DB Sports Tours. Since September 2016 she has also served as an assistant coach at Rathgar Hockey Club.

Honours

Field hockey
Ireland
Women's Hockey World Cup
Runners Up: 2018
Women's FIH Hockey World League
Winners: 2015 Dublin
Women's EuroHockey Championship II
Winners: 2015
Women's FIH Hockey Series
Runners Up: 2019 Banbridge
Women's Four Nations Cup
Runners Up: 2017
Women's Hockey Champions Challenge I
Runners Up: 2014
Loreto
EuroHockey Club Champion's Challenge II
Winners: 2011: 1
Women's Irish Hockey League
Winners: 2008–09: 1
Runners Up: 2011–12, 2012–13, 2014–15: 3 
Irish Senior Cup
Winners: 2009–10: 1 
Runners Up: 2011–12: 1
EY Champions Trophy
Winners: 2018

Gaelic football 
Ballyboden Wanderers GAA
Dublin Ladies Junior E Football Championship
Winners: 2008

References

1991 births
Living people
Irish female field hockey players
Ireland international women's field hockey players
Irish field hockey coaches
Women's Irish Hockey League players
Dublin ladies' Gaelic footballers
Female field hockey defenders
Female field hockey midfielders
Field hockey players from County Dublin
People educated at The High School, Dublin
Alumni of Dublin City University
Alumni of St Mary's University, Twickenham